The Fort Osage R-1 School District is a public school district located in Jackson County, Missouri, in the Kansas City metropolitan area. The district headquarters is in an unincorporated area adjacent to the City of Independence. The district serves a section of northern Independence, the City of Buckner, the City of Levasy, and the City of Sibley.

The district includes  the Woodland Early Childhood Center, Cler-Mont Elementary, Elm Grove Elementary, Blue Hills Elementary, Indian Trails Elementary, Buckner Elementary, Fire Prairie Upper Elementary, Osage Trail Middle School, Fort Osage High School, Career & Technology Center, and Lewis and Clark Academy.

References

Independence, Missouri
School districts in Missouri
Education in Jackson County, Missouri